The Northern League is a collegiate summer baseball league consisting of teams in Illinois and Indiana. It was named the Midwest Collegiate League (MCL) from 2010 to 2021.

History
Formed in 2010, as a four-team summer collegiate wood bat league, MCL played their first season in the summer of 2011. The original four members were the Chicago Zephyrs, Rockford Foresters, Southland Vikings and Will County CrackerJacks. Teams play a 45 game schedule with league playoffs. The league all-star game is played sometime around mid-season.

The league expanded to eight teams for their second season in 2012, with the addition of the DeKalb County Liners, DuPage County Hounds, Illinois Lincolns and Northwest Indiana Oilmen. Two of the teams (Illinois and Will County) failed to complete the season schedule.

Six teams made up the 2013 season as the league welcomed the Lexington Snipes, replacing DeKalb County.

MCL stayed steady with six teams with the addition of the Joliet Admirals (2014) and Michigan City Lakers (2015) replacing two teams (Rockford in 2014; Chicago in 2015) who ceased operations.

Before the 2016 season, the Lexington Snipes announced that they would sit out the season. The league continued with six teams with the addition of the Bloomington Bobcats.

The Crestwood Panthers, the newest team in the Midwest Collegiate League, replaced the Michigan City Lakers before the 2017 season.

Before the 2018 season, the Joliet Admirals became the Joliet Generals.

During the 2020 season, the MCL Minutemen made their debut and stayed in the league for two seasons.
	
After the 2021 season, the Midwest Collegiate League rebranded itself to the Northern League. The Northern League was a name used by several baseball leagues between 1902 and 2010 as is described on the pages listed at Northern League.

For the 2023 season, the Joliet Generals relocated to Griffith, Indiana as the Griffith Generals.

Teams

Current teams

Former teams 
 Chicago Zephyrs (2011-14)
 DeKalb County Liners (2012)
 Illinois Lincolns (2012)
 MCL Minutemen (2020-21)
 Michigan City Lakers (2015-16)
 Rockford Foresters (2011-13)
 Will County CrackerJacks (2011-12)

Champions
Championship series are a best-of three.

References

External links
Official NL website

College baseball leagues in the United States
Summer baseball leagues
Sports leagues established in 2010
2010 establishments in the United States